Traillokyachandra (reigned c. 900 - 930) was the first ruler of the Chandra dynasty in the kingdom of Harikela in eastern Bengal. His father, Subarnachandra, was a vassal to the earlier rulers of the Harikela Kingdom. Traillokyachandra established the dynasty, centered at Devaparvata (near Mainamati, Comilla) and expanded into modern Kachua Upazila before declaring himself as Maharajadhiraja.

References 

Chandra kings